Portland is a settlement in Guadeloupe in the commune of Le Moule, on the island of Grande-Terre.  It is located to the east of Guillocheau and Laureal, and to the west of Dubedou and Zevallos; Conchou is to its north.
Populated places in Guadeloupe

References